

 is a Tunguska event-sized asteroid, classified as a near-Earth object of the Apollo group, approximately  in diameter. On 9 January 2022 with an observation arc of 3 days, it was rated with a Torino scale of 1 for a virtual impactor on 4 July 2023 16:28 UTC. Nominal approach is expected to occur 1 July 2023 01:13 ± 1 day. With a Palermo scale rating of as high as –0.66 at the European Space Agency on 11 January 2022, the odds of impact peaked at about 4.6 times less than the background hazard level. NEODyS was the first risk-page to drop to Torino scale 0 on 12 January 2022 followed by ESA on 13 January 2022, but by January 14 both returned to Torino scale 1. On 14 January 2022 the waxing gibbous moon was as little as 3 degrees from the asteroid delaying observations of the asteroid from January 12–19. On 20 January 2022 with a 16-day observation arc, using JPL #11 the Sentry Risk Table dropped the asteroid to Torino scale 0 and then later that day JPL #12 resulted in it being removed from the risk table.

It came to perihelion (closest approach to the Sun) on 10 November 2021, and then approached Earth from the direction of the Sun making closest Earth approach on 31 December 2021 at distance of about 10 million km.

See also

Notes

References

External links 
 
 
 

Minor planet object articles (unnumbered)
Discoveries by MLS
Near-Earth objects removed from the Sentry Risk Table
20211231
20220106